The Salish or Séliš language , also known as Kalispel–Pend d'oreille, Kalispel–Spokane–Flathead, or Montana Salish to distinguish it from other Salishan languages, is a Salishan language spoken (as of 2005) by about 64 elders of the Flathead Nation in north central Montana and of the Kalispel Indian Reservation in northeastern Washington state, and by another 50 elders (as of 2000) of the Spokane Indian Reservation of Washington. As of 2012, Salish is "critically endangered" in Montana and Idaho according to UNESCO.

Dialects are spoken by the Spokane (Npoqínišcn), Kalispel (Qalispé), Pend d'Oreilles, and Bitterroot Salish (Séliš). The total ethnic population was 8,000 in 1977, but most have switched to English.

As is the case of many other languages of northern North America, Salish is polysynthetic; like other languages of the Mosan language area, it does not make a clear distinction between nouns and verbs. Salish is famous for native translations that treat all lexical Salish words as verbs or clauses in English—for instance, translating a two-word Salish clause that would appear to mean "I-killed a-deer" into English as I killed it. It was a deer.

Language revitalization 
Salish is taught at the Nkwusm Salish Immersion School, in Arlee, Montana. Public schools in Kalispell, Montana offer language classes, a language nest, and intensive training for adults. An online Salish Language Tutor and online Kalispel Salish curriculum are available. A dictionary, "Seliš nyoʔnuntn: Medicine for the Salish Language,"  was expanded from 186 to 816 pages in 2009; children's books and language CDs are also available.

Salish Kootenai College offers Salish language courses, and trains Salish language teachers at its Native American Language Teacher Training Institute as a part of its ongoing efforts to preserve the language. As of May 2013, the organization Yoyoot Skʷkʷimlt ("Strong Young People") is teaching language classes in high schools.

Salish-language Christmas carols are popular for children's holiday programs, which have been broadcast over the Salish Kootenai College television station, and Salish-language karaoke has become popular at the annual Celebrating Salish Conference, held in Spokane, Washington.
As of 2013, many signs on U.S. Route 93 in the Flathead Indian Reservation include the historic Salish and Kutenai names for towns, rivers, and streams. The Missoula City Council is seeking input from the Salish-Pend d'Oreille Culture Committee regarding appropriate Salish-language signage for the City of Missoula.

Phonology

Salish

Vowels
Salish has five vowels, plus an epenthetic schwa  which occurs between an obstruent and a sonorant consonant, or between two unlike sonorants. (Differences in glottalization do not cause epenthesis, and in long sequences not all pairs are separated, for example in  →  "tale",  →  "red raspberry", and  →  "toilet". No word may begin with a vowel.

Consonants
Salish has pharyngeal consonants, which are rare worldwide and uncommon but not unusual in the Mosan Sprachbund to which Salish belongs. It is also unusual in lacking a simple lateral approximant and simple velar consonants ( only occurs in loanwords), though again this is known elsewhere in the Mosan area.

The post-velars are normally transcribed as uvular consonants: .

Salish contrasts affricates with stop–fricative sequences. For example,  "tender, sore" has a sequence of two affricates, whereas  "killdeer" has a tee-esh sequence. All stop consonants are clearly released, even in clusters or word-finally. Though they are generally not aspirated, aspiration often occurs before obstruents and epenthetic schwas before sonorants.

Spokane

Vowels
Spokane vowels show five contrasts: /a/, /e/, /i/, /o/ and /u/, but almost all examples of /a/ and /o/ are lowered from /e/ and /u/, respectively, when those precede uvulars, or precede or follow pharyngeals. Unstressed vowels are inserted to break up certain consonant clusters, with the vowel quality determined by the adjacent consonants. The epenthetic vowel is often realized as /ə/, but also /ɔ/ before rounded uvulars, and /ɪ/ before alveolars and palatals.

Consonants

Stress

Spokane words are polysynthetic, typically based on roots with CVC(C) structure, plus many affixes. There is one main stress in each word, though the location of stress is determined in a complex way (Black 1996).

Morphology
OC:out-of-control morpheme reduplication
SUCCESS:success aspect morpheme

Given its polysynthetic nature, Salish-Spokane-Kalispel encodes meaning in single morphemes rather than lexical items. In the Spokane dialect specifically, the morphemes ¬–nt and –el', denote transitivity and intransitivity, respectively. Meaning, they show whether or not a verb takes a direct object or it does not. For example, in (1) and (2), the single morphemes illustrate these properties rather than it being encoded in the verb as it is in English.

Something that is unique to the Spokane dialect is the SUCCESS aspect morpheme: -nu. The SUCCESS marker allows the denotation that the act took more effort than it normally would otherwise. In (3) and (4) we can see this particular transformation.

The SUCCESS aspect and an OUT-OF-CONTROL morpheme reduplication, found in other Native languages, are commonly found together in Spokane Salish. An OUT-OF-CONTROL reduplication morpheme denotes that the action was done by accident. Below, (5), (6) and (7) exemplify this.

The intransitive morpheme that describes extra effort is –el'. Barry Carlson states that:

"Spokane intransitive success forms, created with -el', emphasize that a subject's control requires extra effort in an event and they focus the duration of this effort well before the event beginning. This makes the predication a result. Thus, their true meaning can only be seen in a larger context."

That is to say, that for intransitive instances it is context driven and therefore extra context is needed in order to use the morpheme –el'. Example (8) derived from (1) illustrates this:

References

 "Phonetic Structures of Montana Salish". Flemming, Ladefoged, & Thomason, 1994. In UCLA Working Papers in Phonetics 87: Fieldwork Studies of Targeted Languages II
 Carlson, Barry. "Situation aspect and a Spokane control morpheme." International Journal of American Linguistics (1996): 59-69.

Further reading

 Giorda, Joseph, and Gregory Mengarini. A Dictionary of the Kalispel or Flat-Head Indian Language. [St. Ignatius]: St. Ignatius Print, Montana, 1877. (Information on how its transcription does not fully indicate pronunciation).
 Post, John A., and Brenda J. Speck. An Edition of Father Post's Kalispel Grammar. Missoula: University of Montana, 1980.
 Vogt, Hans. The Kalispel Language, An Outline of the Grammar with Text, Translations and Dictionary. Oslo: I kommisjon hos J. Dybwad, 1940.

External links

 Nkwusm Salish Language Revitalization Institute
 Seliš u Qlispé Nuwewlštn, The Salish & Pend d'Oreille Comprehensive, Sequenced Language Curriculum
 Char-Koosta News Salish lessons
 Salish language, Kalispel Tribe website, written and audio online course

 Seliš Nuwewlštn, A Beginning Course in Salish & Pend d'Oreille Dialect, Salish Institute, Flashcards, Snʔawʔawtn 2: Level 2, Book 2
 Language of the Kalispel, Gonzaga University
 Spokane Salish Blog
 
Salish language books and CDs, from Nkwusm

OLAC resources in and about the Kalispel-Pend d'Oreille language

Vocabulary and dictionaries 
 Salish Words , Salish/Pend d'Oreille Culture Committee
 Sounds of the Kalispel, English-Kalispel
 Learn Spokane Salish Picture Dictionary
 Dictionaries, Language of the Kalispel, 1800s
 English to Salish Dictionary, 2005
 
Salish language flashcard decks

Audio 
 Salish Audio, Salish-Pend d'Oreille Culture Committee
 Montana Salish (Flathead), UCLA Phonetics Lab Archive
 Flathead-Kalispel language - Audio Bible stories and lessons

Video 
 Salish Language Salish Kootenai College 
 Nkwusm Salish Language School YouTube channel
 Salish stories, from Seliš Nuwewlštn, A Beginning Course in Salish & Pend d'Oreille Dialect

Interior Salish languages
Indigenous languages of Montana
Native American language revitalization
Endangered indigenous languages of the Americas